The 2018–19 Jackson State Tigers basketball team represented Jackson State University during the 2018–19 NCAA Division I men's basketball season. The Tigers were led by sixth-year head coach Wayne Brent, and played their home games at the Williams Assembly Center in Jackson, Mississippi as members of the Southwestern Athletic Conference. They finished the season 13–19 overall, 10–8 in SWAC play to finish in a three-way tie for third place. As the No. 3 seed in the SWAC tournament, they were upset by No. 6 seed Alabama State in the quarterfinals.

Previous season 
The Tigers finished the 2017–18 season 12–20, 9–9 in SWAC play to finish in sixth place. Due to Grambling State's ineligibility, they received the No. 5 seed in the SWAC tournament where they lost to Southern in the quarterfinals.

Roster

Schedule and results  
 

|-
!colspan=9 style=| Non-conference regular season

|-
!colspan=9 style=| SWAC regular season

|-
!colspan=9 style=| SWAC tournament

References 

Jackson State Tigers basketball seasons
Jackson State
J
J